Jaroslav Ševčík (born May 15, 1965 in Brno, Czechoslovakia) is a retired professional ice hockey player who played 13 games in the National Hockey League. He played for the Quebec Nordiques.

Career statistics

External links 
 

1965 births
Living people
Amstel Tijgers players
Czech ice hockey right wingers
Czechoslovak ice hockey right wingers
HK Dukla Trenčín players
Fredericton Express players
Graz 99ers players
Halifax Citadels players
EC KAC players
EC Kapfenberg players
HC Kometa Brno players
Nijmegen Tigers players
Nottingham Panthers players
Quebec Nordiques draft picks
Quebec Nordiques players
EC Ratinger Löwen players
SC Rapperswil-Jona Lakers players
Rotterdam Panda's players
Ice hockey people from Brno
EC VSV players
Czechoslovak expatriate sportspeople in Canada
Czechoslovak expatriate sportspeople in Switzerland
Czechoslovak expatriate sportspeople in the Netherlands
Czechoslovak expatriate ice hockey people
Czech expatriate ice hockey players in Germany
Czech expatriate sportspeople in the Netherlands
Czech expatriate sportspeople in Austria
Czech expatriate sportspeople in England
Expatriate ice hockey players in the Netherlands
Expatriate ice hockey players in Canada
Expatriate ice hockey players in England
Expatriate ice hockey players in Austria